The Sid Ahmed el Maghrun concentration camp was an Italian concentration camp established in El Magrun (also known as Sid Ahmed el Maghrun) in the Italian colony of Libya during the Pacification of Libya that occurred from 1928 to 1932. The camp is recorded as having a population of 13,050 people.

See also
 Italian concentration camps
 Italian concentration camps in Libya
 Italian Libya
 Pacification of Libya

References

Italian concentration camps
Italian Libya